Edward Albert Robertson (18 March 1929 – 5 January 1991) was an Australian politician. Born in Albany, Western Australia, he was educated at the University of Western Australia before becoming a teacher. Having moved to the Northern Territory, he became Chairman of the Northern Territory Council of Social Services. In 1975, he was elected to the Australian Senate as one of the first two senators from the Northern Territory (the other was Bernie Kilgariff). He represented the Labor Party. He remained in the Senate until his retirement in 1987.

Robertson died in 1991.

References

Australian Labor Party members of the Parliament of Australia
Members of the Australian Senate for the Northern Territory
Members of the Australian Senate
People from Albany, Western Australia
1929 births
1991 deaths
20th-century Australian politicians